The DJJ1 "Blue Arrow" is a type of high-speed EMU train used by mainland China Railway. They were manufactured in 2000 by Zhuzhou Electric Locomotive Works.

Overview
8 DJJ1 sets were made. Each set consists of a power car unit and 6 passenger units, seating 421 passengers. At the time of entering service, they ran between Guangzhou and Shenzhen.

All DJJ1 trains were running between Shaoguan and Pingshi since July 2007. It was officially retired in November 2012.

Preservation 
A DJJ1 power car is preserved at Guangzhou Railway Museum.

See also
 China Railway DDJ1
 China Railway DJF1
 China Railway DJF2
 China Railway DJF3
 China Star
 China Railway CR200J
 E1000 series

References

 Zhuzhou product specification

High-speed trains of China
Electric multiple units of China
Zhuzhou locomotives

25 kV AC multiple units
Electric multiple units with locomotive-like power cars